The Valiant-class ships of the line were a class of two 74-gun third rates of the Royal Navy.

Design
The draught for the two Valiant-class ships was a copy of the lines of the captured French ship , which had been captured during the First Battle of Cape Finisterre. They were slightly longer than other British 74s of the time, and carried a significantly heavier armament (thirty 24-pounders on their upper gun decks as opposed to the twenty-eight 18-pounders found on the upper gun decks of all other British 74s at the time).

Ships

Builder: Chatham Dockyard
Ordered: 21 May 1757
Launched: 10 August 1759
Fate: Broken up, 1826

Builder: Woolwich Dockyard
Ordered: 21 May 1757
Launched: 3 March 1764
Fate: Broken up, 1850

References

Lavery, Brian (2003) The Ship of the Line - Volume 1: The development of the battlefleet 1650-1850. Conway Maritime Press. .

 
Ship of the line classes
Ship classes of the Royal Navy